L'Inondation (The Flood)  is an 1880 novella by Émile Zola. Set in the village of Saint-Jory, several miles up the Garonne from Toulouse, it is the story of a family tragedy, told by its patriarch, seventy-year-old Louis Roubieu.

Plot summary
On a beautiful May day, the Garonne floods, washing away all the bridges; ruining nearly two thousand houses; drowning hundreds; and leaving twenty thousand starving to death. The novella describes the immediate impact this flood has on one household.

External links
Project Gutenberg free eBook
 

1880 French novels
Novels by Émile Zola
Novels set in France